The canton of Évrecy is an administrative division of the Calvados department, northwestern France. Its borders were modified at the French canton reorganisation which came into effect in March 2015. Its seat is in Évrecy.

It consists of the following communes:

Amayé-sur-Orne
Avenay
Baron-sur-Odon
Bougy
Bourguébus
La Caine
Le Castelet
Castine-en-Plaine
Esquay-Notre-Dame
Évrecy
Feuguerolles-Bully
Fontaine-Étoupefour
Fontenay-le-Marmion
Gavrus
Grainville-sur-Odon
Grentheville
Laize-Clinchamps
Maizet
Maltot
May-sur-Orne
Mondrainville
Montigny
Préaux-Bocage
Sainte-Honorine-du-Fay
Saint-Martin-de-Fontenay
Soliers
Vacognes-Neuilly
Vieux

References

Cantons of Calvados (department)